A Bear Named Winnie is a 2004 made-for-television drama film directed by John Kent Harrison. It stars Michael Fassbender and David Suchet. It concerns one of the real-life inspirations behind A.A. Milne's Winnie The Pooh.

Plot
At the outbreak of World War 1, troops march through the Manitoban city of Winnipeg. Among them is Lieutenant Harry Colebourn (Fassbender), a veteran with a gift for animals. He soon meets a bear, Winnie, who provides comfort for the soldiers and by order of General Hallholland (David Suchet), becomes the regimental mascot.

Cast

Copyright
To avoid legal problems concerning the copyrights of both Disney and the Milne estate, Winnie the Pooh and anything related to the property is never referenced nor discussed throughout the film.

Critical response
John Ferguson of The Radio Times awarded it two stars and said, "This touching fact-based drama almost manages to carry off its combination of First World War setting and sentimental tale, but is unsure of its target audience."

See also 
Goodbye Christopher Robin - a 2017 biographical drama film about Milne and his son, with Vaughan also acting as a writer and producer.

References

Bibliography

External links
 A Bear Named Winnie at the Internet Movie Database
 A Bear Named Winnie at Rotten Tomatoes

2004 films
2004 television films
2004 biographical drama films
Canadian war drama films
English-language Canadian films
World War I films based on actual events
Films set in 1914
Films about bears
Films directed by John Kent Harrison
2004 drama films
Winnie-the-Pooh films
2000s English-language films
Canadian World War I films
2000s Canadian films